Aleksandrs Jakushin (born 6 January 1991 in Saint Petersburg) is an ice dancer who competes for Latvia. With partner Ksenia Pecherkina, he is the 2010 Latvian national champion.

Programs 
(with Pecherkina)

Results

With Pecherkina

With Smirnova

References

External links 

 

Latvian male ice dancers
1991 births
Living people
Figure skaters from Saint Petersburg
21st-century Latvian people